Gettin' Up (also released as Ebb Tide) is an album by jazz organist Johnny "Hammond" Smith recorded for the Prestige label in 1967.

Reception

The Allmusic site awarded the album 4½ stars stating "This is superior organ-soul-jazz with a feistier edge than much of the genre... there's a brash energy that makes it a cut or two above the norm".

Track listing
All compositions by Johnny "Hammond" Smith except where noted
 "The Sin-In" - 4:20   
 "Stand By Me" (Ben E. King, Jerry Leiber, Mike Stoller) - 2:40   
 "Knock On Wood" (Eddie Floyd, Steve Cropper) - 2:45   
 "The Soulful Blues" - 7:25   
 "Ebb Tide" (Robert Maxwell, Carl Sigman) - 2:40   
 "Summertime" (George Gershwin, Ira Gershwin, DuBose Heyward) - 3:30   
 "Gettin' Up" - 6:10   
 "The 'In' Crowd" (Billy Page) - 3:15

Personnel
Johnny "Hammond" Smith - organ
Virgil Jones - trumpet
Houston Person - tenor saxophone
Thornel Schwartz - guitar
Jimmy Lewis - electric bass
John Harris - drums

Production
 Cal Lampley - producer
 Rudy Van Gelder - engineer

References

Johnny "Hammond" Smith albums
1967 albums
Prestige Records albums
Albums produced by Cal Lampley
Albums recorded at Van Gelder Studio